Riccardo Marchiò (born September 17, 1955) is a retired Italian Army lieutenant general. He served as commander of NATO Rapid Deployable Corps - Italy and of Allied Joint Force Command Brunssum.

Biography

Personal life

Awards and decorations

References 

1955 births
Italian generals
Living people
Military personnel from Rome